The Government of Serbia, the second one led by prime minister Aleksandar Vučić, was elected on 11 August 2016 by a majority vote in the National Assembly. Parliamentary election was held on 24 April 2016, and the ruling coalition of the Serbian Progressive Party and the Socialist Party of Serbia, running in separate lists, won the total of 160 out of 250 seats and retained its parliamentary majority. While the Vučić's Progressive party again won enough seats to form the government alone, he decided to continue cooperation with the Socialists.

The cabinet comprises ministers from the Serbian Progressive Party (SNS), Socialist Party of Serbia (SPS), Social Democratic Party of Serbia (SDPS), Movement of Socialists (PS) and Party of United Pensioners of Serbia (PUPS), as well as some without a party affiliation.  Apart from the prime minister, the cabinet has 19 members: 16 with a ministry and 3 without portfolio. Eleven of them served in the previous cabinet and eight are new.

On 30 May 2017 Vučić resigned the post of prime minister, having been elected as the President of Serbia on the April 2017 elections. First Deputy Ivica Dačić assumed the post of acting prime minister. The new cabinet under prime minister Ana Brnabić, with a similar composition of ministers, was voted on 29 June.

Cabinet members

References

External links

Vucic II
2016 establishments in Serbia
Cabinets established in 2016
2017 disestablishments in Serbia
Cabinets disestablished in 2017